Josh Edmondson may refer to:
 Josh Edmondson (cyclist)
 Josh Edmondson (songwriter)